Connie Meiling (born 29 November 1930) is a retired Danish child actress of the 1930s.

Filmography 
 Kidnapped (1935)
 Snushanerne (1936)
 Panserbasse (1936)
 Der var engang en vicevært (1937)
 Inkognito (1937)
 Pas på svinget i Solby (1940)
 En ganske almindelig pige (1940)

References

External links 
 
 
 

1930 births
Danish child actresses
Danish film actresses
Actresses from Copenhagen
Living people